Bakum is a municipality in Lower Saxony, Germany.

Bakum may also refer to:
Bakum, one of the parts of meitav, Israeli military unit
Bakum, a colloquial form of the Russian male first name Avvakum
John Bakum, former President of Middlesex County College, a community college in New Jersey, United States